Edward Dwain "Ike" Brookens (born January 3, 1949), is a former Major League Baseball (MLB) pitcher who played in 1975 with the Detroit Tigers. He batted and threw right-handed. Brookens had a 0–0 record, with a 5.23 earned run average (ERA), in three games, in his one-year career.

He was drafted by the Washington Senators in the fifth round of the 1967 amateur draft.

Brookens' cousin, Tom Brookens, also played in the majors, with the Tigers, New York Yankees, and Cleveland Indians.

External links

1949 births
Living people
Major League Baseball pitchers
Baseball players from Pennsylvania
Detroit Tigers players
Salisbury Senators players
Evansville Triplets players
Geneva Senators players
Tulsa Oilers (baseball) players
San Jose Bees players
Arkansas Travelers players
Elmira Pioneers players
High Point-Thomasville Royals players